The Sunken Forests of New Hampshire are two large areas of tree stumps submerged off New Hampshire's coast. They sank below sea level after the ending of the Wisconsin Glaciation and subsequent rise in temperature; isostatic rebound has not kept pace with the rise in sea level, and former coastal forests were overtaken by the Atlantic Ocean.

The trees could not thrive, even when they were in the early stages of sinking, because they cannot live in salt water for very long. All that is left of the forests are stumps.

Forests

Odiorne Point
Near Odiorne Point State Park in Rye, this sunken forest is referred to as the "Drowned Forest".  The roots of different coniferous trees (including white pine and hemlock) are visible at most low tides. Core samples taken from the roots indicate that the trees are about 3,500 - 4,000 years old.  Scuba divers commonly explore the Drowned Forest to learn about these ancient remains.

Jenness Beach
The Jenness Beach forest, much larger than Odiorne Point, is rarely sighted above sea level. Sightings have occurred in 1940, 1958, 1962, 1978, 2007, and 2010. The trees, eight to ten feet in circumference, have been carbon dated from 3,400 to 3,800 years old. Currently, only 56 stumps remain, but due to the circumference of the trees, it was likely to have been a much vaster forest. The seafloor on which it sits was probably submerged after the Wisconsin glaciation. Another estimate states that New Hampshire's shore could have been a few miles inland. The former estimate is more likely. Fishermen have hauled up mastodon and mammoth teeth miles offshore, suggesting that the forest extended quite far from its western shoreline boundary. The last few yards of the transatlantic telegraph cable laid in 1874 may have gone through the sunken forest.

See also
 New Hampshire Historical Marker No. 63: Atlantic Cable Station and Sunken Forest

Bibliography
Pielou, E.C. 1992. After the Ice Age: The Return of Life to Glaciated North America

Notes

External links
Boston Globe article on a Massachusetts sunken forest

Natural history of New Hampshire